Marquette Stadium was an outdoor athletic stadium in Milwaukee, Wisconsin, the home field of the Golden Avalanche of Marquette University, its intercollegiate football team.  Located in the Merrill Park neighborhood west of the university, the stadium opened in 1924 and had a seating capacity of 24,000 at its peak. Citing financial issues, the football program was discontinued by the university in December 1960. The concrete grandstands were demolished in the summer of 1976.

The National Football League's Green Bay Packers played several home games per year in the Milwaukee area for 62 seasons, from 1933 through 1994. Marquette Stadium hosted three games during the 1952 season; Packer games in Milwaukee were moved to nearby County Stadium when it opened in 1953.

In addition to football, the stadium was also the home of the Marquette track and field team, which included Olympian Ralph Metcalfe, one of the fastest humans in the early 1930s. Olympic great Jesse Owens made several appearances while a collegian at Ohio State University.

The site was refurbished in 1998 into the Quad Park track and soccer complex, a home venue of Marquette University High School, a few blocks to the northeast. The current field and track are slightly west of the originals at Marquette Stadium.

References

External links
Marquette University digital archives – Marquette Stadium
MU Scoop wiki – Marquette Stadium
Marquette University High School – Quad Park Athletic Complex

Defunct college football venues
Defunct National Football League venues
Green Bay Packers stadiums
Marquette Golden Avalanche football
Demolished sports venues in Wisconsin
Sports venues in Milwaukee
American football venues in Wisconsin
1924 establishments in Wisconsin
Sports venues completed in 1924
1976 disestablishments in Wisconsin
Sports venues demolished in 1976